Grandpass South Grama Niladhari Division is a Grama Niladhari Division of the Colombo Divisional Secretariat of Colombo District of Western Province, Sri Lanka.

R. Premadasa Stadium, Grandpass, Maligawatta and Sugathadasa Stadium are located within, nearby or associated with Grandpass South.

Grandpass South is a surrounded by the New Bazaar, Maligawatta East, Nawagampura, Orugodawatta, Dematagoda, Khettarama, Bloemendhal and Grandpass North Grama Niladhari Divisions.

Demographics

Ethnicity 

The Grandpass South Grama Niladhari Division has a Moor plurality (45.1%), a significant Sinhalese population (34.8%) and a significant Sri Lankan Tamil population (17.6%). In comparison, the Colombo Divisional Secretariat (which contains the Grandpass South Grama Niladhari Division) has a Moor plurality (40.1%), a significant Sri Lankan Tamil population (31.1%) and a significant Sinhalese population (25.0%)

Religion 

The Grandpass South Grama Niladhari Division has a Muslim plurality (45.1%), a significant Buddhist population (31.8%) and a significant Hindu population (14.7%). In comparison, the Colombo Divisional Secretariat (which contains the Grandpass South Grama Niladhari Division) has a Muslim plurality (41.8%), a significant Hindu population (22.7%), a significant Buddhist population (19.0%) and a significant Roman Catholic population (13.1%)

Gallery

References 

Grama Niladhari Divisions of Colombo Divisional Secretariat